Scotchman may refer to:

Scottish people
Scotchman Lake, a lake in South Dakota
Scotchman, a convenience store, see VPS Convenience

See also
Scotsman (disambiguation)